Jarzinho Saul Emmanuel Pieter (11 November 19879 September 2019) was a Curaçaoan professional footballer who played as a goalkeeper for the Curaçaoan clubs Centro Dominguito and Vesta and for the Curaçao national team.

International career
Pieter made his debut for the Curaçao national football team in a 2–0 friendly win over Aruba on 14 November 2013. He was called up to represent Curaçao at the 2017 CONCACAF Gold Cup.

Death
On 9 September 2019, Pieter died of a heart attack after falling ill the night before. Pieter was in Port-au-Prince, Haiti with the Curaçao national football team for a CONCACAF Nations League qualifying match against Haiti.

Honours
Centro Dominguito
 Sekshon Pagá: 2012, 2013, 2015, 2016, 2017

Curaçao
 Caribbean Cup: 2017
 King's Cup: 2019

References

External links
 
 
 

1987 births
2019 deaths
People from Willemstad
Curaçao footballers
Curaçao international footballers
Association football goalkeepers
RKSV Centro Dominguito players
Sekshon Pagá players
S.V. Vesta players